Kathleen Margaret Richardson,  (May 5, 1928 – September 14, 2019) was a Canadian philanthropist and supporter of the arts.

She attended Kelvin High School in Winnipeg and received a B.A. from the University of Manitoba in 1949.

She was president of the Royal Winnipeg Ballet from 1957 to 1961 and has been honorary president since 1963. She heads the Kathleen M. Richardson Foundation.

In 1973, she was made an Officer of the Order of Canada and was promoted to Companion in 1993. In 2005, she was awarded the Order of Manitoba, and in 2007, the RCA Medal. She died on September 14, 2019 at the age of 91.

References

 
 
 

1928 births
2019 deaths
Companions of the Order of Canada
Members of the Order of Manitoba
Canadian philanthropists
University of Manitoba alumni
People from Winnipeg
Richardson family
20th-century philanthropists